Xenomigia dactyloides is a moth of the family Notodontidae. It is found in Ecuador, from the Yanayacu Biological Station in the Napo Province south to Sierra Azul, in the Huacamayos Range.

The length of the forewings is 16-20.5 mm. The ground colour of the forewings is dark brown to blackish brown with orange veins. The hindwings are translucent light grey with an extremely wide, darker grey band along the outer margin.

Etymology
The species name is derived from Greek daktylos (meaning the "thumb-like one") and refers to the dorsal process on the uncus of the male genitalia.

References

Moths described in 2011
Notodontidae of South America